Serafín Lizoain Vidondo (born 20 April 1964 in Pamplona, Spain) better known as Serafín Zubiri is a singer, composer and piano player.

Biography
Zubiri is a blind singer and pianist who has represented Spain twice in the Eurovision Song Contest. He was the vocalist for the group Equus until 1987. In 1992, he recorded the Spanish soundtrack for the Disney film Beauty and the Beast. That same year, he went to the Swedish city of Malmö to represent Spain at the Eurovision Song Contest 1992 with the ballad "Todo esto es la música". In 2000, he won Eurocanción 2000, a contest organized by TVE, and thus again represented Spain at the Eurovision Song Contest 2000 in Stockholm, with the song "Colgado de un sueño" by Chema Purón.

He has also worked in radio and hosted the program for Disabled Unlimited (local TV in Pamplona). He starred alongside Marta Sánchez in the musical play called La magia de Broadway, which premiered at the Teatro Lara in Madrid in October 2000. In 2005, he was appointed vice president of the International Blind Sports Federation (IBSA). In 2007, he competed in the TVE show Mira quién baila, the Spanish version of Dancing With the Stars (where he was runner up). On 14 April 2008 he joined the Argentine version of the same show. He has also showed his skills in other international franchises of this show. In 2013 he competed in the Spanish version of Splash!, broadcast on Antena 3.

Albums
 1987: Inténtalo
 1988: Pedaleando
 1991: Detrás del viento
 1992: Te veo con el corazón
 1995: Un hombre nuevo
 2000: Colgado de un sueño
 2008: Colgado de un sueño (re-release for Argentina)
 2010: Sigo aquí
 2012: X una causa justa

External links
 

1964 births
Living people
People from Pamplona
Blind musicians
Spanish blind people
Eurovision Song Contest entrants for Spain
Eurovision Song Contest entrants of 1992
Eurovision Song Contest entrants of 2000
Musicians from Navarre
Bailando por un Sueño (Argentine TV series) participants